Line M3 is the planned third line of the Warsaw Metro. The first section will number 6 stations and will link Stadion Narodowy with Gocław. As of 2021, its only completed part is the Stadion Narodowy metro station, which is also a M2 metro line station.

History 
First plans were declared on 70s and 80s. It was planned to open M3 between Okęcie and Ochota with Gocław and Julianów. Later on plans were cut off from Okęcie to West Warsaw railway station, then plans covered only stations from Stadion Narodowy to Gocław (like today).

In 2015, Warsaw city authorities planned that the construction of the M3 metro line between Stadion Narodowy and Gocław will commence in 2020. In 2018, Civic Platform's Warsaw mayor candidate Rafał Trzaskowski declared, if he won the presidency, the construction of the M3 metro line will begin before the end of 2023.

In May 2019, Warsaw Metro declared a tender for completion of the technical study of the route of the M3 metro line, including the construction of the Kozia Górka technical and holding station. The technical study was tasked with the analysis of the proposed route and the preferred location of stations of the first section of the metro line between Stadion Narodowy and Gocław.

On 26 June 2020 the technical study results and proposed route were announced. The same day Warsaw Metro announced that the technical study only analysed the first section of the M3 metro line, and following extensions envisage the continuation of the M3 metro line across the Vistula and link to the M1 metro line in the area around the Wilanowska metro station.

On 15 March 2021 the construction of the M3 metro line was confirmed.

Stations

References

Warsaw Metro lines